The Sonata 26 is a sailboat that was designed by American Gary Mull.

The Sonata 26 is a development of the Sonata 8. The two boats share the same specifications.

Production
The boat was built by Investigator Yachts in Australia, who completed 66 examples, starting in 1980. The design is out of production.

Design
The Sonata 26 is a small recreational keelboat, built predominantly of fiberglass. It has a fractional sloop rig, a transom-hung rudder and a lifting or optional fixed fin keel. It displaces  and carries  of ballast.

A fixed keel version was also built with a draft of 

See also
List of sailing boat types

Related development
Sonata 8

Similar sailboats
Tanzer 26

References

Keelboats
1980s sailboat type designs
Sailing yachts
Trailer sailers
Sailboat type designs by Gary Mull
Sailboat types built by Investigator Yachts